A number of European cheeses have been granted Protected Geographical Status under European Union and UK law through the Protected Designation of Origin (PDO),  Protected Geographical Indication (PGI) or Traditional Speciality Guaranteed (TSG) regimes. The legislation is designed to protect regional foods and came into force in 1992 and applies in the EU and in Northern Ireland. The EU designations are open for EU and non-EU products. Following Brexit therefore, UK cheeses remained in the register. Any cheese with a protected geographical cheese in the EU in 2020, is automatically protected in the UK as well. 

The DOOR database includes product names registered cheese names for which registration has been applied.
Registered cheeses by country are as follows:

Austria

Belgium

Czech Republic

Denmark

France

Germany

Greece

Ireland

Italy

Lithuania

Netherlands

Poland

Portugal

Romania

Serbia

Slovakia

Slovenia

Spain

Sweden

United Kingdom

See also 
 List of French Protected Designations of Origin cheeses
 List of Greek Protected Designations of Origin cheeses
 List of Italian PDO cheeses
 List of Portuguese cheeses with protected status
 List of cheeses

References 

 +European Union: Cheeses with designation of origin protected
+, European cheeses which have been granted protected geographical status
Cheeses with protected geographical status
+Cheese, European protected